Sarakhs Rural District is a rural district (dehestan) in the Central District of Sarakhs County, Razavi Khorasan Province, Iran. At the 2006 census, its population was 16,167, in 3,519 families.  The rural district has 14 villages.

References 

Rural Districts of Razavi Khorasan Province
Sarakhs County